The men's 400 metre individual medley event at the 2000 Summer Olympics took place on 17 September at the Sydney International Aquatic Centre in Sydney, Australia.

U.S. swimmer Tom Dolan blistered the entire field, and broke a six-year-old world record to successfully defend his Olympic title in the event. Acknowledging a massive roar from an Australian crowd, Dolan pulled away from the field on the backstroke leg, and then opened up his lead to a powerful finish in a sterling time of 4:11.76. Dolan's teammate Erik Vendt came from last place on the first turn with a spectacular swim to take home the silver in 4:14.23, pulling off another top-two finish of the night for the Americans. Meanwhile, Canada's Curtis Myden managed to repeat his bronze from Atlanta four years earlier in 4:15.33, handing a second straight medal haul for North America in the event's history.

Leading earlier in the prelims, Italy's Alessio Boggiatto finished outside the podium by six-tenths of a second (0.60) in 4:15.93. South Africa's Terence Parkin, a deaf mute since birth, swam on the outside in lane eight, but pulled off a fifth-place effort in an African record of 4:16.92. He was followed in sixth spot by Australia's newcomer Justin Norris (4:17.87), and in seventh by Romania's Cezar Bădiță (4:20.91), who had been overshadowed in his presence by a doping ban before the start of the Games. In May 2000, Badita failed a doping test for a steroid nandralone when he competed at the Mare Nostrum meet in Barcelona, Spain. Japan's Shinya Taniguchi closed out the field to eighth place with a time of 4:20.93.

Records
Prior to this competition, the existing world and Olympic records were as follows.

The following new world and Olympic records were set during this competition.

Results

Heats

Final

References

External links
Official Olympic Report

M
Men's events at the 2000 Summer Olympics